Todd Stroud (born December 17, 1963) is an American football coach and former player. He is the assistant head coach and defensive line coach at the University of Miami in Coral Gables, Florida, a position he has held since 2019. He was previously defensive line coach for University of Akron. Stroud played nose tackle for Florida State from 1983 to 1985, won the team's Bob Crenshaw Award in 1984, and was a team captain in 1985.  He has been an assistant coach at the University of Memphis, Samford University, and Auburn University, and was head football coach at the University of West Alabama from 1994 to 1996.  From 2004 to 2007, he was the defensive line coach at North Carolina State University and from 2007 to 2009 was the strength and conditioning coach for Florida State.

Head coaching record

References

External links
 Miami (FL) profile

1963 births
Living people
American football defensive linemen
Akron Zips football coaches
Auburn Tigers football coaches
Colorado State Rams football coaches
Florida State Seminoles football coaches
Florida State Seminoles football players
Louisiana–Monroe Warhawks football coaches
Memphis Tigers football coaches
Miami Hurricanes football coaches
NC State Wolfpack football coaches
Samford Bulldogs football coaches
UCF Knights football coaches
West Alabama Tigers football coaches
Players of American football from St. Petersburg, Florida